Indian Institute of Science Education and Research, Berhampur (IISER Berhampur) is a public research and education institute in Berhampur, Odisha, India. It was established by the Ministry of Human Resource Development in 2016. IISER  Berhampur is recognized an Institute of National Importance by the Government of India. The institute started functioning from 2016–17 academic year in the month of August. It is one of the 7 IISERs in India.

History 
Indian Institutes of Science Education and Research (IISERs) were created in 2006 through a proclamation of Ministry of Human Resource Development, Government of India, under the category of institutes of national importance, to promote quality education and research in basic sciences. Soon after the announcement, two of these institutes at Pune and Kolkata, respectively, were started in 2006. This was followed by institutes at Mohali (2007), Bhopal and Trivandrum (2008), Tirupati (2015) and Berhampur (2016). Each IISER is a degree granting autonomous institution with a prime focus to integrate science, education and research.

Campus
IISER Berhampur is temporarily functioning from its temporary campus at Government ITI Berhampur. The permanent campus is in construction at Laudigram near Berhampur.
19.1998217, 84.8396076

Academic programs
IISER Berhampur is initially offering Integrated BS-MS programme, Integrated PhD and PhD. Admission to this program is in co-ordination with the other IISERs through a Joint Admission Programme. Admission to the master's degree is through the IISER joint admission process which provides three channels for admission: Kishore Vaigyanik Protsahan Yojana, Joint Entrance Examination – Advanced and state and central boards candidates, which require an additional IISER Aptitude Test. Admission to the various PhD programmes is either with a master's degree in science or with a bachelor's degree, for the integrated PhD programme. Candidates are screened by interviews. In addition to that candidates should have qualified a national level entrance exam for PhD program in science (like GATE). The faculty is organised by various disciplines such as Biology, Chemistry, Mathematics and Physics. Interdisciplinary research is encouraged across disciplines.

See also
 Indian Institutes of Science Education and Research

External links
 IISER Website

References

Berhampur
Research institutes in Odisha
Education in Berhampur
Educational institutions established in 2016
2016 establishments in Odisha